"Take Ya Home" is the second and final single from Lil' Bow Wow's second album Doggy Bag (2001). The song also serves as the theme song to the 2002 family film Like Mike, which was Bow Wow's first starring role in a motion picture. It samples "Have a Nice Day" by Roxanne Shanté. The hook features uncredited vocals from Fundisha.

Charts

Weekly charts

Year-end charts

References

2001 songs
2002 singles
Bow Wow (rapper) songs
Songs written for films
Song recordings produced by the Neptunes
Songs written by Jermaine Dupri
Songs written by Chad Hugo
Songs written by Pharrell Williams